Soldiers of Odin (SOO) is an anti-immigrant group which was founded in Kemi, Finland, in October of 2015. The group was established in response to the thousands of migrants who were arriving in Finland amidst the European migrant crisis. They call themselves a "patriotic organisation that fights for a Finland" that wants to scare away "Islamist intruders" they say cause insecurity and increase crime.

In interviews as well as on the group's public Facebook page, SOO has denied claims which state that he and his group are racist and neo-Nazi. However, the group's founder, Mika Ranta, has connections to the far-right and neo-Nazi Nordic Resistance Movement as well as a criminal conviction which stems from a racially motivated assault which he committed in 2005. According to the Finnish public broadcaster Yle, a private Facebook page for selected members of SOO shows that racism and Nazi sympathies are rampant among higher-ranking members. The group's nature has raised concerns about anti-immigrant vigilantism.

Though the group denies the claim, Soldiers of Odin have been recognised by both the Southern Poverty Law Center and the Anti-Defamation League as a hate group. An ADL report states that their apparent purpose is "to conduct vigilante patrols" to protect citizens from "alleged depredations of refugees", and that "though not all such adherents of the group are white supremacists or bigots, so many of them clearly are that the Soldiers of Odin can easily be considered a hate group."

In addition to Finland, affiliates of the group have a presence in Australia, Belgium, Canada, Germany, the Netherlands, Denmark, Norway, Sweden, Estonia, the United States, the United Kingdom, Portugal and Spain.

History
Soldiers of Odin was founded in the town of Kemi in Northern Finland in October 2015 in response to an almost ten-fold increase in the number of migrants to Finland following the European migrant crisis in 2015. The founder is Mika Ranta, who, while a self-declared neo-Nazi and member of the Finnish Resistance Movement, maintains that his personal views do not represent the group as a whole. The group is named after Odin, the god that rules Asgard, home of the gods, in Norse mythology.

Soldiers of Odin gained momentum in 2016 after incidents such as the New Year's Eve sexual assaults in Germany, the January 2016 stabbing death of Alexandra Mezher, a Lebanese social worker in Sweden, and other migrant-related crime incidents. On 15 March 2016, Soldiers of Odin announced on their Facebook page that they had intervened in the attempted sexual harassment of two underage girls. The group also claimed that the perpetrators were two refugees and that the police thanked Soldiers of Odin for their actions. Further investigation revealed that neither the police nor any bystanders had any knowledge of the event. On March 16, 2016, Soldiers of Odin admitted that one of their members fabricated the story. The group apologized for the announcement and said that the member would be expelled.

The group's number of Facebook likes in Finland alone was more than 49,000 in December 2017.

According to Yle, Soldiers of Odin has connections to the Finnish MV-media alternative media website and has been promised good visibility on the site. MV-media website and its owner Ilja Janitskin have ties to the Russian-backed Donetsk People's Republic.

Presence outside Finland
Soldiers of Odin claims a membership of 600 in Finland. The group also has a presence in Sweden and Norway; however, the Norwegian prime minister condemns the group. The group has a presence in Estonia even though Estonia "has almost no asylum seekers or refugees". Additionally, Soldiers of Odin has a following in the United States, Canada (British Columbia, Alberta, Ontario, Québec and New Brunswick), England, Belgium, Portugal and Germany.

Australia 

Soldiers of Odin Australia arose out of the Reclaim Australia group. It was registered as a non-profit association with the Victorian government in June 2016. Their recruitment rhetoric included exaggerating illegal entry to the country, crime perpetrated by immigrants and the threat of Islamic terrorism, targeting mainly Anglo-Australian men. They also used the "exotic Norse mythology" to attract far-right sympathisers who were willing to take public action.

In 2016, the group ran "safety patrols" of Federation Square, Birrarung Marr and Bourke Street Mall, and outside city train stations at night in Melbourne, Victoria to counteract what it claims was the inability of police to protect the public from rising street crime and gangs such as the so-called Apex gang.

Canada 
Joel Angott, the former president of Soldiers of Odin Canada, has said that his group supports "sustainable immigration". Members of the group participated in the 2022 convoy protest, including Jason LaFace, an organizer for the convoy in Ontario. LaFace, who has since claimed to be National President of Soldiers of Odin Canada, had previously publicly shared anti-immigrant sentiments and made statements against the Black Lives Matter movement and the LGBT community.

Norway
Among the 14 members several are known members of the  extreme far-right and have criminal records. They were opposed by Osebergskipets venner who turned up dressed as vikings as a protest against the misuse of traditional symbols.

Sweden
The group in Sweden have many members who are Neo-Nazis and are convicted of serious crimes. Several are sentenced for assaulting women. The Swedish chapter is headed by Mikael Johansson earlier a member of Nationaldemokraterna.
The group began patrols in Sweden in March 2016, marching in several cities and towns, however they met with opposition  groups and in Gothenburg they themselves had to ask the police for protection of their patrols.

Reception 
The Finnish National Police Commissioner, caused confusion when he initially welcomed the establishment of street patrols. In response, the Minister of the Interior, Petteri Orpo, said, "In Finland it is officials who oversee and take care of order in society. It is a simple matter and we will stick to it." Finnish Security Intelligence Service regards the group as unsettling.

Norwegian police initially expressed mixed reactions to the group, with some departments announcing that they would send marching members away, while others said the group was unproblematic. It caused some controversy when Progress Party MP and spokesperson for justice Jan Arild Ellingsen applauded the establishment of the group, saying they should be "praised". Government and party leaders quickly distanced themselves from his comments, stating public security to be the responsibility of the police.

The Estonian Prime Minister, Taavi Rõivas, criticized the group saying, "In the Republic of Estonia law and order is enforced by the Estonian police. Self-proclaimed gangs do not increase the Estonian people's sense of security in any way; rather the opposite."

Trademark
In spring 2016, the Finnish Patent and Registration Office accepted a request to register "Soldiers of Odin" as a trademark for clothes, footwear and headgear. The owner of the trademark, however, has no connection to the vigilante street patrol group, and is using her brand as a statement against racism and to bring the authorities' decision to accept Soldiers of Odin as a registered organization into question.

References

External links

2015 establishments in Finland
Anti-immigration politics in Australia
Anti-immigration politics in Canada
Anti-immigration politics in Europe
Anti-Islam sentiment in Europe
Anti-Islam sentiment in Australia
Anti-Islam sentiment in Canada
Anti-Islam sentiment in Norway
Anti-Islam sentiment in Sweden
European migrant crisis
Far-right politics in Australia
Far-right politics in Canada
Far-right politics in Finland
Far-right politics in Norway
Far-right politics in Sweden
Vigilantes